Oban River, a watercourse that is part of the Clarence River catchment, is located in the New England and Northern Tablelands districts of New South Wales, Australia.

Course and features
Oban River rises below Mount Duncan, Great Dividing Range on the slopes of the Great Dividing Range, within Little Llangothlin Lake, north of Guyra, and flows generally north-east towards its confluence with the Sara River, within Guy Fawkes River National Park and Chaelundi National Park. The river descends  over its  course.

See also 

 Rivers of New South Wales

References 

 

Northern Tablelands
New England (New South Wales)
Rivers of New South Wales
Armidale Regional Council